Teruel is a city in Aragon, located in eastern Spain, and is also the capital of Teruel Province. It has a population of 35,675 in 2014 making it the least populated provincial capital in the country. It is noted for its harsh climate, with a wide daily variation on temperatures and its renowned jamón serrano (cured ham), its pottery, its surrounding archaeological sites, rock outcrops containing some of the oldest dinosaur remains of the Iberian Peninsula, and its famous events: La Vaquilla del Ángel during the weekend (Friday to Monday) closest to 10 July and "Bodas de Isabel de Segura" around the third weekend of February.
Teruel is regarded as the "town of mudéjar" (Moorish-influenced architecture) due to numerous buildings designed in this style. All of them are comprised in the Mudéjar Architecture of Aragon which is a World Heritage Site by the UNESCO.
 
A campaign group with the slogan Teruel existe ("Teruel exists") was founded in 1999 to press for greater recognition and investment in the town and the province. Due in part to the campaign, transport connections to Teruel were improved with the construction of a motorway between Zaragoza and Sagunto. However, Teruel remains the only provincial capital in peninsular Spain without a direct road or railway link to the national capital, Madrid. A running joke in the Spanish online satirical publication El Mundo Today is that Teruel does not exist.

History

The area around Teruel has been populated since the times of the Celtiberians, who called it Turboleta. The place-name Turboleta could come from the Basque-Iberian term itur + olu + eta (place of the water source, spring), according to the theory of Basque-Iberism. The area was later occupied by the Romans, who left remains in nearby towns, such as Cella.

Some authors claim that in the location of the current city of Teruel (specifically its Jewish quarter) was originally called Tirwal, a name that would have come from the Arabic word meaning "tower." A Muslim enclave is said to have existed in that location in the year 935. However, the corresponding archaeological sites found there belong to a defensive structure, not a population center.

On October 1, 1171, King Alfonso II captured Tirwal. He was threatened by the Almohads’ capture of Valencia, and wanted to strengthen the southern border of his kingdom. In the same year, he founded the city of Teruel, granting it fueros and privileges to facilitate the repopulation of the area.

The foundation of Teruel marked an unprecedented change in the political and territorial structure of southern Aragon. The predominance of Albarracín and Alfambra during the Muslim era was replaced by that of the newly-founded cities, Teruel in particular, to the detriment of Alfambra. Alfabra would remain in the background under the organizing principle of manorialism.

According to one legend, Toruel was founded when all the wise and important people of the town came together to look for signs and omens. The omen they found favorable was a bull, mooing from atop a high place with a star shining on it from above. The high place where they found the bull was eventually made into the town’s main square. According to some authors, the name of the city has its origins in this meeting, since the combination of the words “bull” (toro) and the name of the star, "Actuel," would make "Toroel," which could become "Toruel." The legend of this encounter also explains the star and bull on the city’s flag and coat of arms.

The inhabitants of Teruel intervened in the conquest of Valencia, which had been in the hands of the Muslims, and in the War of the Two Peters against the Kingdom of Castile. The population was granted the title of city in 1347 by Pedro IV of Aragon for their support in the Battle of Épila. It is also important to highlight the considerable importance that the Jewish and Mudejar communities attained within the social and economic life of the city, since their aljamas were consolidated towards the end of the 13th century. 

The Jewish Quarter of Teruel still preserves its name, and many archaeological sites have been found there. In the Middle Ages, Teruel possessed a prominent Jewish community, which was robust during the centuries Muslims were in power and enjoyed several privileges. Later on after the Christian reconquest of Spain, the Jewish community paid a yearly tax of 300 sueldos (in the 14th century). Its members were engaged in commerce and industry, especially in wool-weaving. During the persecutions of 1391 many of them were killed, while others accepted Christianity in order to save their lives.

Teruel was fought over in the Spanish Civil War, and much of the city was destroyed. The Battle of Teruel in December 1937-February 1938, was one of the bloodiest of the war. The town changed hands several times, first falling to the Republicans and eventually being re-taken by the Nationalists. In the course of the fighting, Teruel was subjected to heavy artillery and aerial bombardment. The two sides suffered up to 140,000 casualties between them in the three-month battle. The Nationalists won a decisive victory.

Climate

According to the Köppen climate classification, Teruel has a semi-arid climate (BSk) bordering on a humid subtropical (Cfa) climate. The lowest amount of rainfall is in winter and the greatest falls at the end of spring and autumn.

Main sights
The beauty of the town's cultural inheritance, which has some Islamic influence, has been recognised by UNESCO, which includes four churches in the World Heritage Site Mudéjar Architecture of Aragon, notably the town's ornate cathedral in the Mudéjar style.

One of Teruel's best known monuments is very small statue of a bull on top of a tall column, known as El Torico ("the little bull"). It is located in the main square, Plaza Carlos Castell, more commonly known as the Plaza del Torico in the middle of the town center.

Other sights include:

Torre de El Salvador (14th century), in mudéjar style
Cathedral: Catedral de Santa María de Teruel, in mudéjar style
San Pedro, a mudéjar church (16th century) with a tower similar to that of the cathedral. It includes a mausoleum, Mausoleo de Los Amantes, housing the mummified bodies of Isabel de Segura (a wealthy woman) and Diego de Marcilla (a poor man who battled at Crusades to earn some money with the intention to return to get married with Isabel) whose love ended tragically. This story is known as los amantes de Teruel and has inspired writers (for example Hartzenbusch) and an opera composed by Tomás Bretón.
Church of La Merced, with a bell tower in mudéjar style (the upper sector added later in Baroque style).
Church of San Salvador (17th century), with one of the most outstanding mudéjar towers. It houses a 14th-century wooden sculpture of Christ.
Church of San Martín (17th century).
Torre de San Martín (14th century), in mudéjar style
Church of San Miguel (12th century), remade in the 17th century in Baroque style.
Castillo de Alambes, a 15th-century fortification built over the Arabic Alcazar.
Casa El Torico, Casa Ferrán and Casa La Madrileña, 1910s liberty style houses
Palace of the Marquis of Tosos (17th century)
The Gothic church of St. Francis (1391–1492). It has a single nave with chapels covered by a ribbed vault with no crossing.
Los Arcos, an aqueduct with two orders of arcade from 1538.

On the outskirts of Teruel is Dinópolis Teruel, a combined theme park and museum centred on dinosaurs. Promoted as a paleontological park, it includes a life-size robotic model of a Tyrannosaurus rex. Dinópolis also owns three other museums in the surrounding area, which display the remains of dinosaurs discovered in the region. The chimney of the Teruel Power Plant is one of the tallest freestanding structures in Western Europe.

Transportation
Teruel Airport opened in 2013, but is primarily an aircraft storage and maintenance facility.

Notable people
 Alba Bautista (born 2002), rhythmic gymnast and world bronze medalist 
 David Civera
 Manuel Macías y Casado, general and military governor
 Luis Milla (born 1966), association football player and manager
 Luis Royo
 Pablo Serrano, famous painter and sculptor of the 20th Century.
 Javier Sierra, writer

See also
 La Vaquilla del Ángel
 Diocese of Teruel and Albarracín.
 Lovers of Teruel
 Battle of Teruel

References

External links

La Vaquilla del Ángel
Teruel existe 
Teruel Travelguide and Hotel bookings in English  
The main page of Teruel's Town Hall
English World Heritage Centre
Flickr Photos
Instituto Nacional de Estadística
Teruel exists! (In English)